Bagh-e Komesh Rural District is in the Central District of Pardis County, Tehran province, Iran. At the National Censuses of 2006 and 2011, its constituent parts were in the Central District of Tehran County. The cities of Bumahen and Pardis, and most of Siyahrud Rural District separated from Tehran County on 29 December 2012 to establish Pardis County. The constituent parts of Bagh-e Komesh Rural District were in the newly established Bumehen District. After the census, the Central District was established, with two rural districts (Bagh-e Komesh and Karasht) and the city of Pardis as its capital.

References 

Pardis County

Rural Districts of Tehran Province

Populated places in Tehran Province

Populated places in Pardis County

fa:دهستان باغ کمش